Schwarzenau may refer to:

Places 
 Austria 
 Schwarzenau, Lower Austria, a municipality in the Zwettl district in Lower Austria
 Schwarzenau (Achenkirch), a village in the municipality of Achenkirch in the Schwaz district in Tirol
 Germany 
 Schwarzenau, Bad Berleburg, a borough of Bad Berleburg in North Rhine-Westphalia
 Schwarzenau (Schwarzach am Main), a borough in the municipality Schwarzach am Main in Bavaria
 Schloss Schwarzenau, a castle in the Schwarzenau borough of Bad Berleburg
 Poland 
 the German name of the Polish city Czerniejewo
 Russia 
 1938-1945 Schwarzenau was the name of a village in the East Prussian district of Gumbinnen, before 1936 called 'Jodßen', 1936-1938 called 'Jodschen', and after 1945 renamed Dvoriki; not confirmed

See also 
 Schwarzenau Brethren, a German Baptist Brethren